Beacon Square is a census-designated place (CDP) in Pasco County, Florida, United States.  The population was 7,263 at the 2000 census.

Geography
Beacon Square is located at  (28.212314, -82.748768).

Beacon Square is a subdivision located on the west side of U.S. Highway 19 in Holiday, zip code 34691.

Demographics

As of the census of 2000, there were 7,263 people, 3,509 households, and 2,084 families residing in the CDP. The racial makeup of the CDP was 95.32% White, 1.03% African American, 0.34% Native American, 0.81% Asian, 1.09% from other races, and 1.40% from two or more races. Hispanic or Latino of any race were 3.84% of the population.

There were 3,509 households, out of which 17.8% had children under the age of 18 living with them, 46.6% were married couples living together, 9.3% had a female householder with no husband present, and 40.6% were non-families. 34.5% of all households were made up of individuals, and 23.2% had someone living alone who was 65 years of age or older.  The average household size was 2.07 and the average family size was 2.61.

In the CDP, the population was spread out, with 16.4% under the age of 18, 5.2% from 18 to 24, 22.1% from 25 to 44, 21.0% from 45 to 64, and 35.3% who were 65 years of age or older.  The median age was 51 years. For every 100 females, there were 83.6 males.  For every 100 females age 18 and over, there were 80.4 males.

The median income for a household in the CDP was $27,528, and the median income for a family was $33,125. Males had a median income of $27,220 versus $21,792 for females. The per capita income for the CDP was $16,913.  About 8.1% of families and 9.5% of the population were below the poverty line, including 18.6% of those under age 18 and 8.3% of those age 65 or over.

References

Census-designated places in Pasco County, Florida
Census-designated places in Florida
Populated coastal places in Florida on the Gulf of Mexico